Creatures of the Night is a graphic novel by Neil Gaiman which reprints two different short stories ("The Price" and "Daughter of Owls") from his collection Smoke and Mirrors with elaborate illustrations by artist Michael Zulli.

Stories

In "The Price" a middle-aged writer living with his family in rural England adopts a stray black cat. Every night the cat shows signs of desperate combat resulting in serious wounds. During a four-day period during which the cat is confined to the basement to aid its recovery, the writer experiences several harsh misfortunes which are suddenly resolved when he allows the cat to leave. When the writer stays up one night to see who is fighting the cat, he sees a demonic, shapeshifting creature he believes to be the Devil approach his home, only to be driven off at great cost by the black cat. The story ends with the writer "selfishly" wondering how long the cat can keep defending his home and family.

"Daughter of Owls" takes place in some 17th-century English village, with a framing device set in Victorian or early Edwardian times. An infant foundling girl is discovered with owl feathers in her basket and an owl pellet clutched in one hand. The women of the village believe her to be a witch or other supernatural creature of evil and suggest that she be put to death. However, the elder men of the village give her instead to a former nun living in a ruined convent. The girl grows up as a feral child—because no human voice ever speaks to her—and when she matures her beauty sparks inspires the men of the village to make a disastrous plan to exploit her.

Credits
Written by Neil Gaiman

Art by: Michael Zulli

2004 books
2004 comics debuts
Comics by Neil Gaiman
Dark Horse Comics graphic novels
Comics based on fiction